Ternitz is a town and municipality (14,823 inhabitants end 2014) in the district of Neunkirchen in the Austrian state of Lower Austria, situated at the confluence of the Sierning stream and the River Schwarza, at the western end of the Steinfeld plain. It is divided in the following parts, called Katastralgemeinden: Dunkelstein, Flatz, Holzweg, Mahrersdorf, Pottschach, Putzmannsdorf, Raglitz, Rohrbach am Steinfelde, St. Johann am Steinfelde and Sieding.

History

Ternitz's first documented mention was in 1352 and has town status since 1948. It is traditionally known as an industrial town, being home of the Schoeller-Bleckmann company, which was split up into 19 separate companies in 1989.

Population

References

External links 

Cities and towns in Neunkirchen District, Austria
Rax-Schneeberg Group
Gutenstein Alps